Kenneth Cole (or Ken Cole) may refer to:

Ken Cole (basketball) (born 1943), Australian Olympic basketball player
Kenneth Cole (designer) (born 1954), American clothing designer
 Kenneth Cole Productions, American fashion house founded by the designer
Kenneth Reese Cole Jr. (1938–2001), aide to U.S. President Richard Nixon
Kenneth J. Cole (born 1936), Pennsylvania politician
Kenneth Stewart Cole (1900–1984), American biophysicist